Michael Len Williams II (born March 23, 1989), known professionally as Mike Will Made It (often stylized as Mike WiLL Made-It) or simply Mike Will, is an American record producer and rapper. He is best known for producing trap beats for several Southern hip hop and pop artists on various commercially successful singles, including "Black Beatles" and "Powerglide" by Rae Sremmurd, "Mercy" by Kanye West, "No Lie" by 2 Chainz, "Bandz a Make Her Dance" by Juicy J, "Pour It Up" by Rihanna, "Love Me" by Lil Wayne, "Body Party" by Ciara, "We Can't Stop" by Miley Cyrus, "Formation" by Beyoncé, and "Humble" by Kendrick Lamar. He has released six mixtapes and one studio album, Graduation (album).

Early life 
Williams was born in Marietta, Georgia, the youngest of three children; he has two older sisters. His father, Michael Williams Sr., is a former IBM executive who worked as a club DJ in the 1970s. His mother,  Shirley Williams, a former bank loan officer, was once in a gospel group, singing for Dottie Peoples. He grew up in a musical family as his uncle was an accomplished guitar player and one of his older sisters was a drum major in the Olympics. While growing up, Mike Will was athletic, participating in many sports, including basketball, baseball, and football, with dreams of becoming a professional athlete.

His life also centered around a love of hip-hop music. Mike Will first developed his talent for music by re-playing popular instrumentals that he heard on the radio while he and his friends would freestyle to them. In several interviews, Will has mentioned, in particular, re-playing the instrumental for "Still Fly", a popular song by the southern rap group Big Tymers, on a Casio brand keyboard, and has also mentioned re-playing "Young'n (Holla Back)" by New York rapper Fabolous on production equipment at a local music store.

At age 14, Mike Will began to develop his own beats on a Korg ES1 beat machine, which his father bought for him as a Christmas present from the local music store Mars Music. As Mike Will became more accomplished, he also began to use production equipment, including the Korg Triton, the Akai MPC1000, the Yamaha Motif, and the Roland Fantom. By the time Mike Will was 16, he was spending time at local recording studios in Atlanta, trying to shop his beats to established artists. He was initially ignored, but eventually one of his beat tapes made its way into the hands of Gucci Mane, who then invited Mike Will to Patchwerk studios, an Atlanta recording studio.

Upon graduating high school, Mike Will enrolled at Georgia State University to pursue undergraduate studies mainly due to pressure from his parents, but chose to take a hiatus and eventually dropped out after several semesters,  with a 3.1 GPA, to focus on his music career.

Career

2011–2012: Production and mixtapes 
In an interview with XXL, Mike Will said, "Gucci Mane was the first [major artist] to ever rap on my beat."  Mike Will first met Gucci Mane at Atlanta recording studio, PatchWerk Recording Studios, and upon introducing himself and giving Gucci Mane a CD of beats, Gucci Mane proceeded to freestyle over each of the instrumentals. He then offered Mike Will $1,000 for one of his beats. The two artists began releasing songs together, such as "East Atlanta 6", and a number of songs from Gucci Mane's mixtape, No Pad, No Pencil. After developing this close relationship with Gucci Mane, he began working with other big-name Atlanta rappers such as Future, Waka Flocka Flame, Rocko, and 2 Chainz.

In 2011, Mike Will released his first single, "Tupac Back", performed by Meek Mill and Rick Ross, from the compilation album Self Made Vol. 1. The single was released on April 5, 2011, and peaked at No. 31 on the Hot R&B/Hip-Hop Songs Billboard chart. This came after Mike Will submitted some of his beats to an A&R for Rick Ross' Maybach Music Group label.

Also in 2011, Mike Will worked with Atlanta rapper Future, producing several popular and noteworthy songs together, including "Ain't No Way Around It", "Itchin", and three songs from Future's 2012 major label debut album Pluto: "Neva End", "Truth Gonna Hurt You", and "Turn On the Lights". "Turn On the Lights" was promoted as a single, and to date has peaked at No. 2 on the Hot R&B/Hip-Hop Songs Billboard chart.

On December 27, 2011, Mike Will released his first mixtape, Est. in 1989 (Last of a Dying Breed). It was released in conjunction with popular mixtape website LiveMixtapes.com. Est. in 1989 includes a mix of exclusive songs and songs from Mike Will's catalog, and features artists such as Gucci Mane & 1017 Brick Squad, Future, Waka Flocka Flame, Kanye West & GOOD Music, 2 Chainz, Lil Boosie, Ludacris, Lil Wayne.

On March 23, 2012, Mike Will partnered with popular music site The FADER to announce the second installment of his mixtape series, Est. in 1989 Pt. 2, and to release the mixtape's first single, "Back 2 the Basics", which features his manager/rapper Gucci Mane, founder/CEO/president of Brick Squad and Waka Flocka Flame. The project Est. in 1989 Pt. 2 features songs with Diddy, 2 Chainz, Juicy J, Future, Lil Wayne, T.I., Mac Miller, French Montana, Jeremih, and others. The album was released again on July 24, 2012, in partnership with LiveMixtapes.com.

Will has also worked extensively with Atlanta rapper 2 Chainz, producing "La La", which features Busta Rhymes, from 2 Chainz, then known as Tity Boi, Codeine Cowboy mixtape and "Got One" from 2 Chainz's T.R.U. REALigion mixtape. According to an interview with Complex magazine, Mike Will has been working together with 2 Chainz "since 2008, when he was Tity Boi...We're kind of like family." In 2012, Mike Will produced the lead single, "No Lie", from 2 Chainz' debut album, Based on a T.R.U. Story, released via Def Jam. The single, which features popular recording artist Drake, was released May 8, 2012, and debuted in the top 50 of the Billboard Hot 100, ultimately peaking at No. 1 on Billboards Hot R&B/Hip-Hop Songs chart. The single has been certified Gold by the Recording Industry Association of America, selling over 500,000 copies digitally.

In 2012, Mike WiLL Made-It produced "Bandz a Make Her Dance", a single for Taylor Gang rapper Juicy J that also features Lil Wayne and 2 Chainz. The song was listed as one of the 25 Best Songs of Summer 2012 by Complex magazine, and as of September 2012, the single had peaked at No. 14 on the Billboard Hot R&B/Hip-Hop Songs chart.

Mike Will, alongside producers Kanye West, Mike Dean, Lifted, and Anthony Kilhoffer, co-produced the G.O.O.D. Music single "Mercy", which features vocals by Kanye West, Big Sean, 2 Chainz, and Pusha T. "Mercy", released April 3, 2012, served as the lead single from the G.O.O.D. Music compilation album Cruel Summer, and peaked at No. 1 on the Billboard Hot R&B/Hip-Hop Songs chart, while reaching No. 13 on the Billboard Hot 100. Other notable production efforts for Mike Will include the single "Way Too Gone", featuring Future from Young Jeezy's 2011 studio album Thug Motivation 103: Hustlerz Ambition, "Just a Sign" from B.o.B's second studio album Strange Clouds and "Pour It Up" from Rihanna's 2012 studio album, Unapologetic.

In 2012 interviews, Mike Will mentioned upcoming work with Kanye West, Brandy, Big Sean, and Pusha T.

The third installment of the series, entitled Est. in 1989 2.5 was released on December 24, 2012.  The mixtape featured guest appearances from Gucci Mane, Future, Rihanna, Big Sean, Trinidad Jame$, Lil Wayne, and other artists.

2013–present: Debut studio album and Miley Cyrus collaborations 
Mike Will executive produced Miley Cyrus's fourth studio album Bangerz (2013), including its lead single "We Can't Stop".  He produced eight tracks on Bangerz and six tracks on Cyrus' other project Miley Cyrus & Her Dead Petz.

On September 9, 2013, Mike Will premiered his commercial debut single "23", featuring Wiz Khalifa, Juicy J and Miley Cyrus. He revealed that he had signed with Interscope Records to release his debut album. His debut album will also feature Beyoncé, Future, Kendrick Lamar, and 2 Chainz.

He was named producer of the year by HipHopDX on December 18, 2013.

On June 17, 2014, Mike Will Made It released the first single from his mixtape, "Buy the World", featuring Future, Lil Wayne and Kendrick Lamar. On December 15, 2014, he released his fifth mixtape, Ransom. Featured artists include Big Sean, Juicy J, 2 Chainz, Lil Wayne, and Kendrick Lamar.

On March 24, 2017, he released Ransom 2. The bigger names showcase a quick flip through Mike Will's contact list: Rihanna, Kendrick Lamar, Future, Pharrell, Lil Wayne, Big Sean, Migos, YG, and more.

On August 21, 2020, Mike Will released the single "Bang Bang" with rapper Chief Keef. He also announced that his upcoming project is "74%" done. On November 6, 2020, Mike Will released the song, "What That Speed Bout!?" with rappers Nicki Minaj and YoungBoy Never Broke Again. It is the lead single to his upcoming album, Michael.

Influences 
In interviews, Mike Will has named several musical influences on his own production work. In a "Behind the Beats" interview with Complex magazine, he says that he "always admired Dr. Dre's drums", and calls Timbaland "the first crazy pop producer... He brought so many artists to the game." As a southern producer, he says, he "was also looking up to Shawty Redd. He was the first producer to really bring that dark trap energy and sound." He also refers to DJ Toomp as "my big brother or my mentor", saying, "I love what he does." In an interview, with AOL's The Boombox, Mike WiLL also cites Pharrell as a producer that he respects.

Production equipment 
Mike Will uses a variety of production equipment to create beats. His gear includes the Korg Triton, Akai MPC 1000, Logic Pro, FL Studio, Yamaha Motif, and the Roland Fantom-X.

Ear Drummer Records 

In 2006, Mike Will started his own production company called . In 2013, he founded Ear Drummer Records (initially known as Eardruma Records) and signed the label to Interscope Records on December 19, 2013. In 2014, Mike Will signed Rae Sremmurd and Two-9 to the label.

Artists 
 Mike Will Made It
Shotta Spence
 Two-9
 Rae Sremmurd
 Eearz
 Andréa
 Trouble (Formerly)
 Rico Pressley

In-house producers 
 30 Roc
 Blue Cheeze
 DJ Fu
 Ducko McFli
 GT
 J-Bo
 Marz
 Mike Will Made It
 Pluss
 P-Nazty
 Randy Lanphear
 Resource
 Scooly
 Shawn Ferrari
 Swae Lee
 Whatlilshoddysay
 F1Jo

Discography

Studio albums

Soundtrack albums

Mixtapes

Singles

Promotional singles

Notes

Awards and nominations

BET Hip Hop Awards 
The BET Hip Hop Awards were established in 2006 by the Black Entertainment Television network to celebrate hip-hop performers, producers, and music video directors.

Grammy Awards 

!Ref.
|-
|rowspan="3"|2017
|Lemonade (Beyoncé)
|Album of the Year
|
|style="text-align:center;" rowspan="3"|
|-
|rowspan="2"|"Formation" (Beyoncé)
|Song of the Year
|
|-
|rowspan="2"|Record of the Year
|
|-
|rowspan="2"|2018
|rowspan="2"|"HUMBLE." (Kendrick Lamar)
|
| style="text-align:center;" rowspan="2"| 
|-
|rowspan="2"|Best Rap Song
|
|-
|2019
|"King's Dead"
| 
| style="text-align:center|

iHeartRadio Music Awards

References 

1989 births
Living people
African-American businesspeople
African-American record producers
American hip hop record producers
American music industry executives
American rhythm and blues musicians
Businesspeople from Georgia (U.S. state)
Georgia State University alumni
Interscope Records artists
Musicians from Atlanta
African-American male rappers
Musicians from Marietta, Georgia
Southern hip hop musicians
Trap musicians
Grammy Award winners for rap music
FL Studio users
American pop musicians
African-American DJs